India Mahdavi (born April 4, 1962) is an Iranian-French architect and designer. Over 20 years since launching her own studio, Mahdavi has built a name for herself—working on large hospitality projects, luxury collaborations, and even launching her own furniture line. Often referred to as the “reigning queen of color,” Mahdavi is most known for her whimsical spaces and forms infused with playful palettes. Projects include the Hotel du Cloitre in Arles, Coburg Bar at London's Connaught Hotel, Monte Carlo Beach in Monaco, Rivington Hotel in Manhattan and the Townhouse Hotel in Miami.

Early life and education 
India Mahdavi was born in 1962 in Tehran to a Persian father and English-Egyptian mother.  Spending her early years in Cambridge, Massachusetts, Mahdavi’s love of color began with Disney movies, Bugs Bunny, Peanuts—even the colorful foods found in her lunchbox. In a New York Times interview, Mahdavi recalls her early life in America as "a time of very strong colors".

Raised in the United states, Germany, and France, Mahdavi’s heritage and cosmopolitan upbringing had a major influence on her work. Her studies took her to École des Beaux Arts in Paris, France, from 1980 to 1986, where she studied architecture, and eventually to New York, where she studied furniture design at Parsons and graphic design at the School of Visual Arts.

Later, Mahdavi met a restaurateur, Jonathan Morr, looking to open a hotel on a small budget – today known as the Townhouse Hotel. She went to Miami to see it and became the designer of the 80 bedroom stay. It would be one of her earliest projects that solidified and set the stage for her interior design career.

Design career 
After her studies, Mahdavi returned to France to work as the artistic director of Christian Liagre for seven years and left in 1997 to start on her own. Today, she runs a studio, showroom, and shop, all steps away from each other on the Rue de Cases in Paris.

Hotels & Restaurants 

Shortly before opening her studio in 2000, Mahdavi worked with restaurateur Jonathan Morr on Townhouse, Miami in 1999. A white slate with bright accent colors, the hotel serves as a backdrop to a “endless summer” retreat. This first hotel by Mahdavi explored what would later become her thesis; rich, bold colors to extend beyond the trends of time. Following Townhouse Miami, Mahdavi designed a series of restaurants and bars including the Condesa DF Hotel of Mexico City, At the Connaught in London, and Le Germain in Paris. Best known for its 5 meter tall resin silhouette of a woman, Le Germain’s brasserie was accompanied by a 30 person private cinema, both exploring the material possibilities to give identity to the spaces. Whimsical spaces such as Le Germain are no stranger to Mahdavi. Her design work also includes the design of the famous Laduree restaurant in three locations: Los Angeles, Tokyo, and Geneva. Each location indulges in a design and pastel color palette inspired by Marie Antoinette's style.

In 2014, Mahdavi was hired to design the Sketch Restaurant at the Gallery of London, a restaurant that goes through a redesign every two years. The restaurant has been dubbed the most shared restaurant in the world on Instagram by many, including India herself. Mahdavi called the space "an immersive installation of monochrome thought", and said that she wanted people to feel like they were in a film while in the space. Wrapping the walls are 250 drawings by the artist David Shrigley.

Retail & Residential 
Mahdavi has also dabbled in a variety of retail and residential designs. With the popularity of Sketch came opportunities to design retail spaces for both Tod's and RedValentino, both of which infused furniture pieces from her line. Her residential projects are much like her retail and hospitality designs, packed with color and playfulness.

Furniture 
Soon after founding her studio, Mahdavi began with an exploration into furniture pieces, and opened three showrooms along the Rue Las Casas in Paris, France. The first opening in 2003, and then two following in 2011 and 2020. These showrooms serve as windows into the spaces Mahdavi designs, both showcasing her furniture and different installations.. These furniture lines began in 2003, with a small sample of works, then grew and developed into another exploration, Petits Objets in 2011. Petits Objets includes many different pieces, both functional and decorative, and Mahdavi’s signature color palette that would be used in many of her designs.

Collaborations 
As Mahdavi became more of a household name, opportunities arose for her to collaborate with various designers, brands, and creators. In all of these projects, the signature rich colors and patterns of Mahdavi’s designs can be seen. One of her first collaborations was with JEM, a jewelry designer in 2011. Using architectural language she translated to a minute scale, Mahdavi worked with the “ethically minded” company to create a gold voided line. Following this, India worked with several other brands to create ceramics, hardware, and tiles. Some notable projects include the Louis Vuitton Nomadic Objects, designs with Nespresso, and a 56 shade paint line with Meriguet-Carrère in 2019. In 2020, she worked with Longwy Enamels to outfit her iconic Bishop stools, originally produced in 2003, in haute couture flower versions. In other works like the 2015 Cogolin interior garden collection and the 2020 De Gournay wallpaper, it can be seen how Mahdavi’s work of colors and materials goes beyond what she has explored in her own lines, and that her style transcends into new explorations. Not only using these works to engage with new collaborators, but seeing each as a new design opportunity, different from what is conducted solely in her own studio.

Style & Impact

Style 
Mahdavi's work is a mixture of elegance and cartoonish color.  She credits her heritage, worldly upbringing and design study to her notable design style. "You can't pin it down to a specific influence or reference," said Yann Le Coadic, "...Every detail of a space India designs is thought out to the millimeter, and yet the overall impression is very uncontrived. India focuses on how a space will be lived and not what visual impression it will make."

“I really think of myself like the French word metissage (meaning the cultural mix of society),” says India. “I am a pure product of the Middle East product –at least by blood – but I actually got to know my homeland much later.” To know where I belong very late in life made it more emotional for me. It was like ‘what did I miss out on’ and ‘how can I integrate these elements into my life today.’”

Regarded as the “queen of color”, Mahdavi is most known for her playful palettes and unwavering use of color in her designs. Ralph Pucci, who has Mahdavi’s colorful furniture on display at the Ralph Pucci International Gallery says that her “work has humor, but it’s not 100 percent humor, which would make it kitsch. It has sophistication, but it’s not 100 percent sophistication, which would make it predictable. It’s this perfect balance that makes her work original.”

Impact 
One of Mahdavi’s most notable projects, Sketch at the Gallery of London, turned her into a social media sensation. Central to Mahdavi’s design was a velvety pink that adorned every corner of the space, including her own furniture piece featured, the ‘Charlotte’ armchair. In regards to the restaurant’s sensational recognition, Mahdavi said “I don’t want to sound like I’m boasting, but I changed the way people thought about pink.”  When asked about her legacy as a designer, Mahdavi replied “I will probably be remembered as someone who uses color as her own language. The language of freedom. And that is fine with me."

Looking for measurable impact of her work, it can be clearly found the social media success of her projects—especially the Sketch Gallery of London. True to Mahdavi’s previous works, the velvety pink space was packed with whimsy—its cool yet bright atmosphere drawing thousands of visitors just to snap the perfect picture with highly sought geotag.   In regards to the restaurant’s sensational recognition, Mahdavi said “I don’t want to sound like I’m boasting, but I changed the way people thought about pink.”

Influences & Process 
When it comes to her influences, Mahdavi looks to location and her heritage to drive her design work. She proclaims she is “polyglot and polychrome.” Polyglot—meaning she draws inspiration from many different cultures and locations, and polychrome in that she is “like a chameleon, always changing color.” When choosing colors for a design or space, Mahdavi claims that she likes “when colors swear at each other.”  To achieve the cartoonish quality that is central to Mahdavi’s designs, Mahdavi looks to bright colors and matte, flat materiality—opting to use velvet over cotton or linen to absorb the palette she’s working with.

Claiming that “now the only way to be really original is to go to your own library,” Mahdavi seeks inspiration from less frequented places such as her birthplace of Tehran, Iran. Algerian artist, Adel Abdessemed, labels Mahdavi’s works as “a form of childlike and joyous orientalism inspired by Iran.” He claims that Mahdavi has created a fantastical image of the East.

Despite the social media success of her design at Sketch, India Mahdavi says she hasn’t let social media influence the way she works, and instead attributes her Instagram-worthy spaces to her cinematic aspirations. India Mahdavi grew up with a strong affinity for film and at the age of 17, she was going to the movies three times a day, particularly studying the aesthetics of the scenes. In fact, when Mahdavi entered architecture school, she didn’t love it and was considering a career in film set design (much like interior designer Kelly Wearstler). Now, as an interior and furniture designer, Mahdavi says she “trained her [my] eye to work like a camera.”

Awards 

 Officier des Arts et des Lettres 2015
Architectural Digest's 2014 AD100 list
 AD Spain's AD Award 2014
Designer of the Year by Maison et Objet 2004

Publishing History

References 

1962 births
20th-century French architects
21st-century French architects
French women architects
Iranian women architects
People from Tehran
Architects from Paris
Iranian emigrants to France
Iranian expatriates in Germany
Iranian expatriates in the United States
Parsons School of Design alumni
Cooper Union alumni
Iranian people of Egyptian descent
Iranian people of English descent
Living people
20th-century French women